is a Japanese professional footballer who plays for Belgian Pro League side Charleroi.

Career
After six seasons with Vissel Kobe, he moved to Śląsk Wrocław in January 2016.
 

On the sixth of July 2017, he became the most expensive player ever at Waasland-Beveren.

End of januar 2018 Morioka made a transfer in the Belgian First Division A to RSC Anderlecht for 2,50 million euros. 

A year later he is being hired by RSC Charleroi and in the summer of 2019 the club takes him over on a definite basis for 1,5 million euros.

On 11 October 2021, he extended his contract at Charleroi until 2024.

Club statistics

National team statistics

References

External links
 
 
 
 Ryota Morioka at the Japan National Football Team
 

1991 births
Living people
Association football people from Hyōgo Prefecture
Japanese footballers
Japanese expatriate footballers
Japan international footballers
J1 League players
J2 League players
Ekstraklasa players
Belgian Pro League players
Vissel Kobe players
S.K. Beveren players
Śląsk Wrocław players
R.S.C. Anderlecht players
R. Charleroi S.C. players
Expatriate footballers in Poland
Expatriate footballers in Belgium
Japanese expatriate sportspeople in Poland
Japanese expatriate sportspeople in Belgium
Association football midfielders